A hologram is a three-dimensional image created by holography.

Hologram may also refer to:

Hologram, a 2001 EP by Eiko Shimamiya
Hologram (EP), a 2018 EP by Key
"Hologram" (Minmi song), 2015
"Hologram" (Nico Touches the Walls song), 2009
"Hologram", a song by Backstreet Boys from This Is Us, 2009
"Hologram", a song by Chris Spedding from Enemy Within, 1986
"Hologram", a song by the Horrors from V, 2017
Holograms, the fictional band in the 1980s animated series Jem and the Holograms

See also
Holography (disambiguation)